Hideyoshi (written: 秀吉, 秀義, 英義 or 英良) is a masculine Japanese given name. Notable people with the name include:

 (born 1974), a Japanese football player.
Hideyoshi Enrique Arakaki Chinen (born 1998) is a Peruvian footballer 
 (1890–1944), Japanese general
 (1112–1184), Japanese samurai and daimyō
 (1536/1537–1598), Japanese samurai and daimyō

Fictional characters:
Hideyoshi, a character in Pokémon Conquest
Kenji Hideyoshi, main character in The Tattoo, a novel by Chris McKinney
, a character in Baka and Test
Nagachika Hideyoshi, a character in Tokyo Ghoul

Japanese masculine given names